State Route 315 (SR 315), also known as Tellico-Reliance Road, is a  north–south state highway in the Unicoi Mountains region of southeastern East Tennessee.

Route description

SR 315 begins in Polk County in Reliance at an intersection with SR 30. It immediately heads across the Hiwassee River via a long bridge to pass through the community before leaving Reliance and entering the Unicoi Mountains and the Cherokee National Forest. The highway then winds its way northeast through the mountains to cross into Monroe County. SR 315 then leaves the mountains and the forest to pass through farmland before coming to an end at an intersection with SR 39 in Jalapa. The entire route of SR 315 is a rural two-lane highway.

Major intersections

References

315
Transportation in Polk County, Tennessee
Transportation in Monroe County, Tennessee